Jewellery findings are the parts used to join jewellery components together to form a completed article.

List of findings
 Clasps to complete necklaces and bracelets
 Earwires to link an earring to the wearer's ear
 Ring blanks for making finger rings
 Bails, metal loops, and jump rings, for completing jewellery. Jump rings can be used by themselves for chains
 Pin stems and brooch assemblies
 Tuxedo stud findings, letters of the alphabet, cluster settings, metal beads and balls
 Plastic, fabric or metal stringing material for threading beads

Findings are available in all the jewellery metals—sterling silver, plated silver, gold, niobium, titanium, aluminium, and copper.

References

See also 

 Finding Glossary

Jewellery components